Social welfare has long been an important part of Sri Lankan society and a significant political issue. It is concerned with the provision by the state of benefits and services. Social welfare is mostly funded through general taxation.

Social welfare

Health care 

Sri Lanka has an universal health care system that is free for any one using it, including both citizens and non-citizens. It is publicly funded and run by Ministry of Health. This includes both dental care and community medicine.

Social security
Social security benefits are administered by the Department of Social Services. As of 2022, they include:

 Samurdhi Allowance - for low income families. 
 Pregnant Mother's Allowance   
 Elderly, Disabled, and Kidney Aatients  Allowance  
 Mahapola Scholarship

State housing and land 

The government provides State housing and land to those in need.

Education 

Primary and secondary education is free in Sri Lanka and is the responsibility of the Ministry of Education and the Provincial Governments. Undergraduate education in state universities are free, but limited to less than 10% of the student population.

Pensions

Government pensions 
State sector, some state owned and private sector organizations provides pensions for employees who retire at that ages between 55 to 62 years, having complete a number of years of service (eg. 30 years). Pensions are granted after lessor terms of service for certain groups such as member of parliaments (5 years) and military personal (10 years).

Superannuation 
Private provident funds existed in the private sector, with some companies contributing on a voluntary basis until 1958, when the Employees' Provident Fund was established by S. W. R. D. Bandaranaike following the enactment of the Employees' Provident Fund Act No 15 of 1958 which established the Employees' Provident Fund which made it compulsory for all employers and employees to contribute if not employed in a pensionable role. This was further supplemented by the Employees' Trust Fund in 1981.

Paid Parental Leave
Females are entitled for paid maternity leave in both the state and private sector with the employer responsible for payment of their wages during the period of leave. In addition, mothers are allowed a daily time allowance to feed babies until they reach one year of age.

References